Ivan Anthony Dorschner born September 21, 1990) is a Filipino-American actor, television host and model based in the Philippines. He is best known for being a former housemate of the Philippine reality television show Pinoy Big Brother: Teen Clash 2010. He is currently under contract to GMA Network, as well as the network's talent management arm GMA Artist Center along with Mika Dela Cruz and Addy Raj.

Early life and education 
Ivan Anthony Dorschner was born on September 21, 1990 in Los Angeles, California, to a German-Irish father and a Filipino mother. He has four half-siblings, two from his father's previous marriage and the other two from his stepmother, who is Korean. Dorschner was raised in California. On his summer vacation, he visited the Philippines. During his childhood, he was a Boy Scout and received the highest rank of Eagle Scout. Ivan graduated in 2008 from Verdugo Hills High School, in Tujunga, CA. He studied at the College of the Canyons in  International Diplomacy studies (switching from Bio-Science), but was put on hold until his third year when he decided to remain in the Philippines.

Career

2010–2012: Beginnings and breakthrough

Prior to a television career, Dorschner modeled and did photoshoots both in the United States and the Philippines. He became a ramp model for the clothing line Folded and Hung; was a guest on the show Us Girls; was brought to the stage on Showtime and played HepHepHooray in one of the Philippine's popular TV Program Wowowee.
At the time of that visit, he didn't realize he'd be on a reality show Pinoy Big Brother: Teen Clash 2010. Dorschner stayed in the house for  months; with the help of his fans voting for him to stay. He emerged fifth among the six finalists topped by Fil-Aussie James Reid who gained 19.75 percent of text votes. Aside from movies & TV roles, Dorschner played in the 2011 theater production of Snow White and Prince Oswald, as Prince Oswald.

2016–present: Transfer to GMA Network, revived career and rising popularity

In November 2016, after a four year-hiatus from showbiz, Dorschner, alongside fellow Kapuso actor turned–Meant to Be co-star Addy Raj signed an exclusive contract with GMA Network and also management contract with GMA Artist Center as well. In January 2017, he starred and rose to fame in Meant to Be along with the second peek of Barbie Forteza tagged as VanBie. In October of the same year, he appeared in action-fantasy series Super Ma'am as Isko Dagohoy.

In January 2018, Dorschner was chosen to portray Inigo Sandoval in Kapuso rom-com series The One That Got Away alongside Dennis Trillo, Lovi Poe, Rhian Ramos, Max Collins, Jason Abalos and Migo Adecer.

Filmography

Television

Film

Music video appearances

Accolades

|-
| 2017
| Ivan Dorschner
| 65th FAMAS Awards - German Moreno Youth Achievement Award (special award)
| 
|}

Notes

References

External links 

 Ivan Dorschner's profile on Star Magic
 Ivan Dorschner's profile on GMA Artist Center
 
 

1990 births
Living people
Filipino people of American descent
21st-century Filipino male actors
Male actors from Rizal
College of the Canyons alumni
Filipino male comedians
Filipino male television actors
Filipino male models
Filipino people of German descent
Filipino people of Irish descent
Male actors from Los Angeles
American expatriates in the Philippines
Male models from California
Models from Los Angeles
American models of Filipino descent
American emigrants to the Philippines
American male actors of Filipino descent
American people of German descent
American people of Irish descent
American people of Filipino descent
People from Rizal
People from Los Angeles
Pinoy Big Brother contestants
Star Magic
GMA Network personalities
Tagalog people
Filipino male film actors